Agyneta straminicola is a species of sheet weaver found in Colombia and Ecuador. It was described by Millidge in 1991.

References

straminicola
Endemic fauna of Ecuador
Spiders of South America
Spiders described in 1991